Fernando Nottebohm (born 1940 in Buenos Aires) is a neuroscientist and the Dorothea L. Leonhardt Professor at Rockefeller University, as well as being head of the Laboratory of Animal Behavior and director of the Field Research Center for Ecology and Ethology.

Education
Nottebohm was born in Argentina and received his PhD in zoology from the University of California, Berkeley in 1966 while working with Peter Marler. Afterwards, he conducted extensive investigations of the song of the rufous-collared sparrow (Zonotrichia capensis).

Research
Nottebohm is best known for his work on neurogenesis in the adult vertebrate brain, a phenomenon that previously had been thought impossible by most scientists.

Career 
1967-71 Assistant professor, Rockefeller University
1971-76 Associate professor, Rockefeller University
1976–present Professor, Rockefeller University
1981–present Director, Rockefeller University Field Research Center for Ecology and Ethology, Millbrook, New York

Honors and awards 

1982 Fellow of the American Association for the Advancement of Science
1982 Fellow of the American Academy of Arts and Sciences.
1982 Kenneth Craik Research Award of St. John's College, Cambridge University, England, for  outstanding scholarship in physiological psychology.
1984 Pattison Award for Distinguished Research in the Neurosciences.
1986 Nelson Medical Lectureship, awarded by the School of Medicine of the University of California, Davis
1986 Elliott Coue's Award, American Ornithologists’ Union.
1987 Painton Award, Cooper Ornithological Society.
1988 Member of the National Academy of Sciences.  USA
1990 MERIT Award, National Institutes of Mental Health.
1991 Member of the American Philosophical Society.
1992 Charles A. Dana Award (jointly with Masakazu Konishi) for pioneering achievement in The Health Sciences.
1995 King Solomon Lecturer at Hebrew University of Jerusalem.
1996 Named to the Dorothea L. Leonhardt Distinguished Professorship, Rockefeller University
1999 Fondation Ipsen Neuronal Plasticity Prize (jointly with Peter Marler and Masakazu Konishi).
2003 Ernst Florey Plenary Lecture. 29th Göttingen Neurobiology Conference & 15th Meeting  of German Neuroscience Society.
2003 Lewis S. Rosenstiel Award for Distinguished Work in the Basic Medical Sciences (shared with Masakazu Konishi and Peter Marler).   
2004 Karl Spencer Lashley Award (shared with Masakazu Konishi). American Philosophical Society
2006 Benjamin Franklin Medal in Life Sciences. The Franklin Institute.
2006 Sven Berggren Lecture and Prize. Royal Physiographic Society in Lund.

References

People from Buenos Aires
Argentine neuroscientists
University of California, Berkeley alumni
Living people
Members of the United States National Academy of Sciences
1940 births
Members of the Royal Physiographic Society in Lund
Rockefeller University faculty
Fellows of the American Association for the Advancement of Science
Fellows of the American Academy of Arts and Sciences
20th-century Argentine scientists
21st-century Argentine scientists
Argentine emigrants to the United States
Members of the American Philosophical Society